The following is a list of events affecting Philippine television in 2015. Events listed include television show debuts, finales, cancellations, and channel launches, closures and rebrandings, as well as information about controversies and carriage disputes.

Events

January
 January 15–19 – Major networks including ABS-CBN, PTV, TV5, GMA Network, and 9TV covered the first Papal visit to the country of Pope Francis.
 January 20 – Salmiya Makasait won  in Eat Bulaga's Laban o Bawi.
 January 24
 Noontime show Eat Bulaga! launches its own mobile application.
 Spyros was hailed as the first-ever PINASikat Grand Champion on It's Showtime, the grand finals of which were held at Ynares Center, Antipolo City.

February
 February 5 – HOOQ, a streaming service jointly owned by Singtel, Sony Pictures and Warner Bros., was launched and became available in the Philippines.
 February 11 – ABS-CBN Corporation formally launched its digital terrestrial television brand, ABS-CBN TV Plus, after almost 5 years of trial period.
 February 15 – Heart Evangelista and Senator Chiz Escudero tied the knot after their wedding rites in Balesin Island, Polillo, Quezon.
 February 23 – Milay Osiones won  in Eat Bulaga's Laban o Bawi.
 February 26 – Movie and Television Review and Classification Board (MTRCB), on their 30th anniversary launches their newest informercial shown in different TV stations, on the responsible viewing of television. Couple Judy Ann Santos and Ryan Agoncillo starred in the 30 sec. informercial.
 February 28 – The Game Channel, after almost 3 years on broadcasting, ceased on February 28, 2015. The channel space was taken over by My Movie Channel on March 1.

March
 March 1 – Jason Dy of Team Sarah was declared as the grand winner of the second season of The Voice of the Philippines held at the Newport Performing Arts Theater, Resorts World Manila. He was coached by Sarah Geronimo.
 March 9 – Sharon Cuneta formally returned to her original network, ABS-CBN after a 4-year involvement with TV5. Cuneta's first major project for her return will be Your Face Sounds Familiar.
 March 14 – Vice Ganda's look-alike (Daniel Aliermo from Davao City) wins as Ultimate Kalokalike Face 3 on It's Showtime.
 March 16 – CNN Philippines was launched; prior to its launching the channel was known as 9TV. The rebranding was done after Turner Broadcasting System inked a partnership and licensing deal with Nine Media Corporation in October of last year.
 March 20 – Willie Revillame also embarked his return to GMA Network after signing their blocktime deal for the upcoming Sunday variety show, Wowowin.
 March 22 – Jack City was replaced by CT, thus becoming independent from its parent network. Upon launch, the channel broadened its programming focus by adding talk shows, sitcoms and men's lifestyle programs to its roster.
 March 26 – Solar Entertainment announced its broadcast of the Fight of the Century between Manny Pacquiao and Floyd Mayweather Jr. on May 3, 2015. As stated in a press conference that day, it was broadcast on May 3 via delayed broadcast in three major television stations in the Philippines, ABS-CBN, TV5, and GMA Network (who waivered its exclusive contract with Solar to allow its multi-network coverage, but maintained its exclusive live broadcast on its radio division), with Solar Sports as its main content provider for this historic event in boxing.

April
 April 10 – Comedian Ai-Ai de las Alas was transferred and also embarked her return to GMA Network after 16-year involvement with ABS-CBN.

May
 May 7 – Globe Telecom and The Walt Disney Company signed a multi-year partnership to access Disney's digital lifestyle experience for Globe users including video-on-demand, interactive content, promotions and other related services.
 May 14 – El Gamma Penumbra, a shadow dance troupe from Batangas who once joined Pilipinas Got Talent, won the first season of Asia's Got Talent aired on AXN Asia. Khusugtun of Mongolia and Gerphil Flores claimed their runner-up finishes.
 May 18 –  ABS-CBN announced a 10-year deal with the National Collegiate Athletic Association. It marks the return of the league on the said network after a 3-year deal contract with TV5. It will be shown on ABS-CBN Sports+Action Channel 23.'
 May 22 – Philippines premiere cable channel for women, Lifestyle Network revealed a new logo and a new name will become Lifestyle.
 May 23 – Xiamara Sophia Vigor (Mini Selena Gomez) hailed as the MiniMe season 2 grand winner on It's Showtime.
 May 27 – iflix, a streaming service owned by Catcha Group, was launched and became available in the Philippines, alongside Malaysia.
 May 31 – Angelia Gabrena Ong, of Manila was hailed as the 2015 Miss Philippines Earth, on its Grand Coronation Night that held at the Mall of Asia Arena.

June
 June 7 – Comedian Melai Cantiveros was named the first grand winner of Your Face Sounds Familiar: Season 1 at the Newport Performing Arts Theater, Resorts World Manila.
 June 15–16 – Former Solar News anchorwomen Nancy Irlanda and Claire Celdran both back to their respective networks, Nancy is with ANC and Claire for CNN Philippines.

July
 July 1
 My Movie Channel ceased broadcasting. The closure was announced by Solar a day before.
 Jennylyn Mercado was crowned for the first time as the FHM's sexiest woman for 2015. Andrea Torres, Ellen Adarna, Sam Pinto, Solenn Heussaff, were also part of the Top 5.
 July 16 – The Phenomenal "KalyeSerye" (aired over Juan for All, All For Juan segment of Eat Bulaga) featuring the love story of Alden (played by Alden Richards) and Yaya Dub (played by Maine Mendoza) collectively known as "AlDub" and the intervention of Lola Nidora (played by Wally Bayola) had gathered high ratings and trending topics for EB, up against rival It's Showtime which Ryan Rems Sarita became part of the regular cast after he won the Funny Juan competition.

August
 August 3 – Bernadette Sembrano was named as the permanent anchor replacement of Korina Sanchez on TV Patrol. 
 August 8 – Ryan Rems Sarita was hailed as the Funny One grand winner on It's Showtime.
 August 26 – ABS-CBN Corporation president and CEO Charo Santos-Concio, announced that she will chair the Gala of the 43rd International Emmy Awards on November 23, 2015, in New York City. Actor Piolo Pascual will accompany her in the gala and he will also present one award.
 August 30 – Elha Nympha, coached by Bamboo Mañalac, won the second season of The Voice Kids held at the Newport Performing Arts Theater, Resorts World Manila.

September
 September 11 – TV5 Entertainment Head Wilma Galvante, formally left the station, as she will formed a content provider company, that will produce TV shows on TV5, and other TV channels.
 September 16 – After almost 3 years ago on broadcasting, TeleAsia Filipino and TeleAsia Chinese ceased broadcasting. The closure was announced by My Pinoy TV Broadband Inc. a day before.

October
 October 3 – ABS-CBN launched a high-definition feed on select cable television providers. The network's newscasts and the yearly 7 Last Words special during Holy Week will continued to broadcast in standard definition format until March 2018 as well as some selected movies and the Saturday morning asianovela Angel Wings will also continue to carry it in standard definition format.
 October 5 – TV5 and Cignal Digital TV inked a deal with Bloomberg for the launching of Bloomberg TV Philippines, a 24/7 English business news channel.
 October 10 – Jay-R was hailed as COC - Clash of Celebrities grand winner on It's Showtime.
 October 14 – TV5 announced the appointment of VIVA CEO Vic Del Rosario, Jr. as their network's chief entertainment strategist.

 October 17 – Team Dyosa was hailed as Lip Swak Challenge grand winner on It's Showtime held at Hoops Dome, Cebu.
 October 24 
Eat Bulaga! held a benefit concert dubbed as "Sa Tamang Panahon" ("In the Right Time") at the Philippine Arena to raise funds for libraries in certain schools in the Philippines. With sold out tickets, the concert highlights the love team of Maine Mendoza and Alden Richards (collectively known as AlDub in the Kalyeserye portion of Eat Bulaga!) and the Twitter hashtag #ALDubEBTamangPanahon made 41 million tweets becoming the most tweeted event in the world for 2015.
 Team Vice, Jugs and Teddy was hailed as It's Showtime's sixth anniversary (Magpasikat 2015: Happy ANIMversary!) champion.
 October 31
 Names Going Wild was hailed as Halo Halloween Grand Champion on It's Showtime.
 Ma. Katherine "Kit" Cunanan named as the grand winner of It's Showtime That's My Tomboy Astig 2, a segment dedicated to lesbians.

November
 November 8 – Jimboy Martin and Miho Nishida were both crowned as the Big Winners of the recently concluded Pinoy Big Brother: 737. The season's big night was held at Albay Astrodome in Legazpi, Albay.
 November 18 – Celestial Tiger Entertainment has teamed with Viva Communications to create Celestial Movies Pinoy, a localized Philippines version of CTE's Chinese film channel Celestial Movies.

December
 December 3 – ABS-CBN dominated 33 categories, including Best TV Station, in the recently concluded 29th PMPC Star Awards for Television held at the Kia Theatre.
 December 5 – Garcia Family from San Pedro, Laguna was hailed as Karoling-Galing grand winner on It's Showtime.
 December 6 – Miss Philippines Angelia Ong was named the Miss Earth 2015 in its coronation night held at the Marx Halle in Vienna, Austria, marking the first time in the pageant's nearly 15-year history that a country has won back-to-back titles.
 December 12 – Alab Poi Dancers from Abucay, Bataan was hailed as the first-ever Todo BiGay grand winner on It's Showtime.
 December 13 – Actress Denise Laurel was named the second grand winner of Your Face Sounds Familiar: season 2 at the Newport Performing Arts Theater, Resorts World Manila.
 December 19 - Migo Adcer and Klea Pineda was hailed as StarStruck Season 6 Ultimate Male and Female Survivors.
 December 20 – Pia Alonzo Wurtzbach from the Philippines was named as Miss Universe 2015 held at the AXIS, Las Vegas, Nevada, USA. 
 December 31 – After 7 years of broadcasting, Balls and Balls HD ceased on the night of New Year's Eve. Its HD channel, as well as the entire channel's content (except the Ultimate Fighting Championship which the broadcast rights was acquired by TV5's sports division Sports5) will be absorbed to the S+A brand on New Year's Day.

Debuts

ABS-CBN

The following are programs that debuted on ABS-CBN:

GMA

The following are programs that debuted on GMA Network:

TV5

The following are programs that debuted on TV5:

PTV

Other channels
The following are programs that debuted on other minor channels:

Returning or renamed programs

Major networks

Other channels

Programs transferring networks

Major networks

Other channels

Milestone episodes
The following shows made their Milestone episodes in 2015:

Finales

ABS-CBN

The following are programs that ended on ABS-CBN:

Stopped airing
 February 4: My Puhunan
 February 6: Red Alert
 April 10: Haikyū!! (season 1) (reason: replaced by WansapanaSummer, the program resumed on April 19)
 April 12: The Legend of Korra (reruns) and Teenage Mutant Ninja Turtles (season 2) (reason: replaced by Kuroko's Basketball and Haikyū!! on April 19)
 October 24: Teenage Mutant Ninja Turtles (season 2), SpongeBob SquarePants and The Flying House (reason: Due to the coverage of NBA 2015–16 season as prior to removal; however these programs continued on Yey!)

GMA

The following are programs that ended on GMA Network:

Stopped airing
 March 29: GMA Blockbusters
 April 24 (reason: cost-cutting measures)
 24 Oras Ilokano (GMA Ilocos)
 24 Oras Bikol (GMA Bicol)
 24 Oras Northern Mindanao (GMA Northern Mindanao)
 Isyu Subong Negrense (GMA Bacolod)
 Buena Mano Balita (GMA Cebu)
 Arangkada (GMA Iloilo/GMA Bacolod)
 Primera Balita (GMA Dagupan)
 Una Ka BAI (GMA Davao)
 April 26: People, Events and Places
 August 28: 24 Oras North Central Luzon (GMA Dagupan)
 November 13: Ratsada 24 Oras (GMA Iloilo) (reason: retrenchment)

TV5

The following are programs that ended on TV5:

PTV
 January 4: In This Corner

Stopped airing
 March: Asenso Pinoy

Other channels

Stopped airing
 February 5: Voltron Force, Tai Chi Chasers and Yu-Gi-Oh! Zexal (season 1) on S+A (reason: Action Kids block prior to removal and transferred to Yey!)
 March: Asenso Pinoy on PTV 4
 August 9: Spoon on Net 25
 August 28: Eyeshield 21 (season 1) (rerun) on Hero (reason: to be replaced with Log Horizon (rerun) from August 31)

Networks
The following is a list of Free-to-Air and Local Cable Networks making noteworthy launches and closures during 2015.

Launches

Rebranded
The following is a list of television stations or cable channels that have made or will make noteworthy network rebrands in 2015.

Closures

Stopped broadcasting
The following is a list of stations and channels or networks that have stopped broadcasting or (temporarily) off the air in 2015.

Awards
January 28: MITV Gawad Kamalayan, organized by the Mapua Institute of Technology.
February 8: 2015 Paragala Central Luzon Media Awards, organized by the Holy Angel University.
February 18: 2015 Adamson University Media Awards, organized by the Adamson University. (awarded to GMA News anchor Vicky Morales)
February 19: 2015 Gawad Tanglaw Awards, organized by the UPHSD-Delta Las Pinas
April 11: The Platinum Stallion Media Awards 2015, organized by the Trinity University of Asia
April 16: 11th USTV Awards, organized by the Pontifical and Royal University of Santo Tomas
April 26: Golden Screen TV Awards, organized by the Entertainment Press Society, held at the Carlos Romulo Theater, Makati
April 28: 23rd KBP Golden Dove Awards, organized by the Kapisanan ng mga Brodkaster ng Pilipinas (KBP)
June 11: 35th Rotary Club of Manila Journalism Awards, organized by the Rotary Club of Manila
June 14: 46th Box Office Entertainment Awards, organized by the Guillermo Mendoza Memorial Scholarship Foundation
July 3: 17th VACC Awards, organized by the Volunteers Against Crime and Corruption
August 15: 5th EdukCircle TV Awards, organized by the International Center for Communication Studies, held at the UP Theater
August 16: 10th COMGUILD Media Awards, organized by the COMGUILD Center for Journalism
November 4: 37th Catholic Mass Media Awards, organized by the CMMA Foundation
November 7: Illumine: 1st GCIC Innovation Awards for Television, organized by Global City Innovative College
December 3: 29th PMPC Star Awards for Television, organized by the Philippine Movie Press Club
December: 1st ALTA Media Icon Awards, organized by the University of Perpetual Help System DALTA

Winners

These are awards held in 2015.

Local
This list only includes the Golden Screen TV Awards and PMPC Star Awards for Television.

International
This list only includes the International Emmys and the Asian Television Awards.

Deaths
January
 January 9 – Susan Calo Medina, host of Travel Time and Tipong Pinoy (b. 1941)

March
 March 4 – Jam Sebastian, part of Jamich, a real-life couple who gained popularity in YouTube (b. 1986)
 March 14 – Liezl Martinez, actress and MTRCB board member (b.1967)

April
 April 17 – Ricardo Reyes a.k.a. Richie D'Horsie, comedian (b. 1957)

June
 June 13 – Junix Inocian, actor (b. 1951)
 June 25 – Jonathan Oldan, assistant cameraman, CNN Philippines (b. 1986)

July
 July 7 – Julia Buencamino, teen actress (b. 1999)
 July 8 – Lucita Soriano, veteran actress (b. 1941)
 July 15 – Pocholo Montes, veteran actor (b. 1946)
 July 24 – Jimboy Salazar, actor and singer (b. 1973)

August
 August 2 – Marcelo "Ozu" Ong, actor, dancer and singer, member of Masculados Dos (b. 1985)
 August 6 – Amado Pineda, weatherman, GMA Network (b. 1938)

October
 October 8 – Elizabeth Ramsey, comedian, singer and actress (b. 1931)

November
 November 8 – Rey Mercaral, Net 25/Eagle News Service anchor

See also
2015 in television

References

 
Television in the Philippines by year
Philippine television-related lists